Rhonda John-Davis (born 28 November 1978) is a Trinidadian veteran netball player, basketball player, lecturer and the captain of the Trinidad and Tobago national netball team who plays in the positions of goal attack, wing attack or center. She has over 150 international caps for Trinidad and Tobago in a career spanning over 20 years. In 2021, she was erroneously listed by Google as one of the members of the 2021–22 North Carolina Tar Heels men's basketball team.

Career 
She holds the unique records for featuring in most number of Netball World Cup tournaments as well featuring in most consecutive World Cup tournaments (6) by any player and she is also the first and only player in the world to play in 6 World Cup tournaments. Rhonda achieved this milestone at the age of 40 after captaining the national side during the 2019 Netball World Cup where the team finished at ninth position. 

Rhonda made her World Cup debut for Trinidad and Tobago as a 21 year old at the 1999 World Netball Championships, where the team finished at ninth position. She has also represented Trinidad and Tobago at the 2014 Commonwealth Games. In addition to netball, she is also a basketball player plays in the guard position and her husband is also a basketball player.

References 

1978 births
Living people
Trinidad and Tobago netball players
Trinidad and Tobago basketball players
Netball players at the 2014 Commonwealth Games
Guards (basketball)
Commonwealth Games competitors for Trinidad and Tobago
Sportspeople from Port of Spain
2019 Netball World Cup players